Denver is the capital of the U.S. state of Colorado.

Denver may also refer to:

Places
 Denver, Victoria, a locality in Australia
 Denver, Nova Scotia, a village in Canada
 Denver, Norfolk, a village and civil parish in the United Kingdom

United States
 Denver Basin, a geologic basin in eastern Colorado
 Denver, Illinois, an unincorporated community
 Denver Township, Richland County, Illinois
 Denver, Indiana, a town
 Denver, Iowa, a city
 Denver, Kentucky, an unincorporated community
 Denver Township, Isabella County, Michigan
 Denver Township, Newaygo County, Michigan
 Denver Township, Rock County, Minnesota
 Denver, Missouri, a village
 Denver Township, Adams County, Nebraska
 Denver, North Carolina, a census-designated place and unincorporated community
 Denver, Ross County, Ohio, an unincorporated community
 Denver, Wood County, Ohio, an unincorporated community
 Denver, Pennsylvania, a borough
 Denver City, Texas, a town
 Denver, West Virginia, an unincorporated community

Schools 
 Denver Academy, a private day school in Denver, Colorado
 Denver School of the Arts, a pioneering magnet school in Denver, Colorado
 Denver School of Science and Technology, a public charter school in Denver, Colorado
 Denver Seminary, an accredited, graduate-level institution in Littleton, Colorado
 University of Denver, a private university in Denver, Colorado

Ships 
 Denver-class cruiser, a US Navy class of protected cruisers
 USS Denver (CL-16), a cruiser commissioned in 1904
 USS Denver (CL-58), a light cruiser commissioned 1942
 USS Denver (LPD-9), an amphibious transport dock commissioned in 1968

Sports
 Denver Broncos, an American professional football team based in Denver, Colorado
 Denver Nuggets, an American professional basketball team based in Denver, Colorado
 Denver Pioneers, the athletic program of the University of Denver
 Colorado Rockies, the American professional baseball team based in Denver, Colorado

Other uses 
 Denver (name), a list of people with the surname or given name
 "Denver" (song), by Larry Gatlin & the Gatlin Brothers Band
 The Denver Dry Goods Company or The Denver, a defunct company in Denver, Colorado
 Denver Windmill, listed windmill in England
 Duke of Denver, a fictional English title of nobility in the Lord Peter Wimsey books by Dorothy Sayers
 Project Denver, codename of a computer microarchitecture designed by Nvidia
 Roman Catholic Archdiocese of Denver, Denver, Colorado
 Denver, the title character of the cartoon Denver, the Last Dinosaur

See also
 Dapper Denver Dooley, a Walter Lantz cartoon character and Woody Woodpecker's rival
 Denver boot, a wheel clamp for immobilizing vehicles 
 Denver Developmental Screening Test or Denver Scale, a developmental screening exam for children
 Denver omelette or Western omelette
 Denver sandwich or Western sandwich